Mitko Trendafilov (born 25 December 1969) is a Bulgarian former professional footballer who played as a midfielder.

External links
 Mitko Trendafilov at MaltaFootball.com
 

1969 births
Living people
Bulgarian footballers
Bulgaria international footballers
FC Dimitrovgrad players
Neftochimic Burgas players
PFC CSKA Sofia players
PFC Lokomotiv Plovdiv players
Marsaxlokk F.C. players
PFC Chernomorets Burgas players
PFC Nesebar players
First Professional Football League (Bulgaria) players
Expatriate footballers in Malta
Bulgarian expatriates in Malta
Association football midfielders
People from Dimitrovgrad, Bulgaria
Sportspeople from Haskovo Province